Gary Williams (born 15 December 1970) is a British jazz singer, writer, and broadcaster whose performances include concerts, cabaret shows, and theatre. Williams has recorded ten solo albums and written Cabaret Secrets, a book on stagecraft.

Music career 
Williams started his career in social clubs before performing with the BBC Big Band on BBC Radio Humberside. This led to appearances on BBC Radio 2's Big Band Special, BBC television's Pebble Mill at One with David Jacobs, and Gloria Hunniford's Open House with Burt Bacharach. He played the role of Frank Sinatra for the West End show The Rat Pack for 150 performances at the Haymarket Theatre, the Adelphi Theatre, and subsequent UK and European tours.

In 2006 he performed in BBC1's 'Doctor Who – A Celebration' concert with David Tennant and the BBC National Orchestra of Wales with the BBC National Chorus of Wales conducted by Ben Foster. In 2007 he recorded two songs for the soundtrack of the Warner Bros' motion picture Mrs Ratcliffe's Revolution.

He regularly performs in cabaret at Ronnie Scott's Jazz Club, The Crazy Coqs, The Pheasantry, privately for theatre producer Cameron Mackintosh and with the Syd Lawrence Orchestra. He is a regular soloist in the concert hall with the CBSO, RSNO, Halle Orchestra, RLPO, BBC Concert Orchestra (for Friday Night Is Music Night), Lahti Symphony Orchestra, Northern Sinfonia, the Melbourne Symphony Orchestra, the Adelaide Symphony Orchestra for the Adelaide Cabaret Festival and the RTÉ Concert Orchestra.

His most popular show is the interactive Sinatra Jukebox where, "instead of an hour of songs and anecdote, halfway through members of the audience were invited to fill in request forms". Reviewing the show, Cabaret Scenes said, "I can think of no other singer to better pay homage to Ol' Blue Eyes on his 100th birthday." In 2014 he performed on BBC Radio 2 with the BBC Concert Orchestra for David Jacobs – A Celebration alongside Michael Ball, Joe Stilgoe, Liz Robertson, and Marti Webb. In 2015 he made his debut at Bestival and the following year at Camp Bestival.

Williams's Christmas show A Swingin' Christmas was given a five star review by the London Evening Standard and described as "The jolliest sleigh-ride in town!". The same show was given four stars by The Times, which on the same night gave Michael Bublé's show at the O2 three stars. A big band version of the show was aired on Sky Arts on 18th December 2022  with the LP Swing Orchestra and Mica Paris. 

In 2017, The Sunday Times profiled Williams, describing him as "one of the country's best-loved crooners".

In 2022 he made his New York debut at Carnegie Hall as part of a tribute concert to Peggy Lee, staged by the Mabel Mercer Foundation.

Recording career 
In 2004, Williams recorded Alone Together with the John Wilson Orchestra at Abbey Road Studios. He returned to the studios for In the Lounge with Gary Williams and Swingin' on Broadway, both recorded with his own band. Highlights of these three albums appeared on Gary Williams – The Best of Abbey Road, released in 2010. Also in 2010 he released Gary Williams Meets Frank Sinatra, recorded with Chris Dean and His Orchestra, which was awarded Jazz FM's album of the week. In 2011 he released Let There Be Love – A Celebration of Nat King Cole with the James Pearson Trio. Recorded live in 2003, it lay forgotten about until rediscovered late 2010. Gary Williams Live in Brazil was released in 2013. In 2015 after a successful crowdfunding appeal he released a big band Christmas album Big Band Wonderland. In 2017 Williams released Gary Williams at the Movies, which was awarded four stars by the London Evening Standard which said, "This selection of movie tunes sung with Sinatra-esque flair, will transport you down memory lane and get your serotonin levels soaring." In 2018 he released 'Treasure Seeker' his first album as a singer/songwriter.

Broadcaster 
Williams has hosted the weekly musical biography show The Legends of Las Vegas for The Wireless by Age UK. He hosted the weekly podcast In Conversation Radio, similar in style to Desert Island Discs, and guests included Fred Astaire's daughter Ava Astaire MacKenzie, Christopher Biggins, and Jeffrey Archer. He has contributed to BBC Radio 4's Excess Baggage and its consumer program You and Yours. Other broadcasting work includes a two-hour special for the centenary of Frank Sinatra for BBC Radio Humberside, a contributor for Don Black's Cabaret Nights on BBC Radio 2, two hour Christmas specials for BBC Radio Humberside in 2016 and 2017 and a one-hour special on The Art of the Crooner for BBC Radio 2 50s.
Williams also does corporate presenting and voice-over work.

Writing
Williams' book Cabaret Secrets: How to create your own show, travel the world and get paid to do what you love has been featured in Time Out London, described as "an ideal vade mecum for anybody who wants to succeed in cabaret".

Charity work 
In 2008 he was invited to a reception by the Prime Minister's wife Sarah Brown at 10 Downing Street in acknowledgement of his work for The Caron Keating Foundation. In 2010 he performed a benefit concert for Grimsby's 'Big Red Heart Appeal'.

Discography
 2004: Alone Together
 2006: In the Lounge with Gary Williams
 2008: Swingin' on Broadway
 2010: Gary Williams Meets Frank Sinatra
 2011: Let There Be Love
 2013: Live in Brazil
 2015: Big Band Wonderland
 2017: At the Movies
 2018: Treasure Seeker
 2019: Legends
 2020: Wild About Wilder
 2020: 95
 2020: On Days Like These
 2020: I'm Coming Home for Christmas (single)
 2021: Heroes and Villains (EP)
 2021: Stage and Screen (EP)
 2021: I'm Coming Home for Christmas (EP)

References

External links 
 Official site
 Article in The Stage

Living people
English male singers
English jazz singers
Place of birth missing (living people)
English broadcasters
Easy listening musicians
1970 births
21st-century English singers
21st-century British male singers
British male jazz musicians